Dybenko is a Ukrainian surname. Notable people with the surname include:

 Heorhiy Dybenko (born 1928), Soviet athlete
 Pavel Dybenko (1889–1938), Bolshevik revolutionary

See also
 

Ukrainian-language surnames